Hollandia  is a genus of moths of the family Erebidae. The genus was erected by Arthur Gardiner Butler in 1892.

Species
Hollandia sigillata Butler, 1892 Gabon, Central African Republic
Hollandia spurrelli Hampson, 1926 Ghana, Nigeria

References

Calpinae